Mount Abrams is a mountain  east of Mount Brice, in the Behrendt Mountains. It was discovered and photographed from the air by the Ronne Antarctic Research Expedition (RARE) of 1947–48 under Finn Ronne. It was named by Ronne for Talbert Abrams, a noted photogrammetric engineer and instrument manufacturer, who was a supporter of RARE.

Mountains of Graham Land
Landforms of the Biscoe Islands